Cinemagic is an international children's film festival in Belfast, Northern Ireland, and in Dublin, Republic of Ireland, founded in 1988 that bills itself as the World Screen Festival for young people. The organisation is a company Limited By Guarantee and a registered charity.

Cinemagic's patrons include Dermot O'Leary, Brian Cox and Julian Fellowes.

See also 
Northern Ireland Screen

External links
Official site

Festivals in Belfast
Film festivals in Ireland
Film festivals in Northern Ireland
Children's film festivals
Children's festivals in the United Kingdom